Patrick McCarthy is a record producer from Dublin, Ireland who has worked for several rock and alternative rock artists, including The Waterboys, Counting Crows, R.E.M., and U2.

In 1998, he replaced Scott Litt as R.E.M.'s in-house producer, co-producing three of their albums Up, Reveal and Around the Sun as well as the Man on the Moon soundtrack; McCarthy had previously served as engineer on R.E.M.'s albums Monster and New Adventures in Hi-Fi.  In 2007 it was announced that R.E.M.'s fourteenth studio album, Accelerate, would be produced by Jacknife Lee rather than McCarthy.  McCarthy also mixed Madonna's successful 1998 album Ray of Light. More recently, he wrote English-language lyrics for the popular YouTube Japanese song "Bad Apple!!", subsequently performed by Cristina Vee.

References

Irish record producers
Musicians from Dublin (city)
Year of birth missing (living people)
Living people